Mihail Movilă (? – 1608) was the prince of Moldavia for a short time in 1607.

Life 
He was the elder son of Simion I Movilă and became prince of Moldova after the death of his father in September 1607.

 by his cousin Constantin Movilă, pushed by his mother, the ambitious Erzsébet Csomortany de Losoncz, widow of Prince Ieremia Movilă.

He tried to regain his throne in November 1607 but was forced into exile the following month in the court of Radu Șerban in Wallachia, where he eventually died.

References

Sources 

 Alexandru Dimitrie Xenopol Histoire des Roumains de la Dacie trajane : Depuis les origines jusqu'à l'union des principautés. E Leroux Paris (1896)
 Nicolas Iorga Histoire des Roumains et de la romanité orientale. (1920)
  Constantin C. Giurescu & Dinu C. Giurescu, Istoria Românilor Volume III (après 1606), Editura Ştiinţifică şi Enciclopedică, București, 1977.
 Jean Nouzille La Moldavie, Histoire tragique d'une région européenne, Ed. Bieler, .
 
 

Rulers of Moldavia
1608 deaths
Year of birth unknown
People of the Long Turkish War